The National Association of College and University Residence Halls Incorporated (NACURH) is an international organization made up of eight regions. The eight regions cover the entire United States and parts of Canada. Previously it has also covered parts of Mexico and The Bahamas. NACURH brings together students who live in residence halls on college campuses to share ideas, resources, and best practices in order to improve their residential communities.

Mission and vision

Mission
"As an organization, NACURH creates environments that empower, motivate, and equip residence hall leaders by providing them with skills and resources in order for them to excel and positively impact their campus communities. ."

Vision  
"The National Association of College and University Residence Halls, NACURH Incorporated, seeks to create a network of civically engaged students sharing common experiences through residential leadership opportunities."

History 
In 1954, Iowa State University, the University of Colorado, the University of Missouri and the University of Northern Iowa formed the Midwest Dormitory Conference. The conference was the brainchild of Iowa State's Student Residence Hall Government, which felt that such an organization was needed to encourage the exchange of ideas and information. All four schools sent delegations to the first conference, which was held in the same year. In 1955, the name of the group was changed to the Association of College and University Residence Halls (ACURH). By 1957, the organization had expanded to 11 institutional members.

A similar organization, the Inter-Mountain Residence Hall Association (IMRHA), merged with ACURH in 1961, necessitating a name change to the National Association of College and University Residence Halls (NACURH). The association was split into two "associate" regions, the Midwest Association (MACURH) and the Inter-Mountain Association (IACURH), based on the two original groups. By 1963, the organization had expanded to 26 institutional members.

In 1964, the Pacific Association (PACURH), the North Atlantic Association (NAACURH) and the South Atlantic Association (SAACURH) were all created "on paper" to allow for possible future growth of the organization. In this same year, the National Residence Hall Honorary was also created by NACURH. By 1963, the organization had expanded to 41 institutional members.

In 1968, the Great Lakes Region (GLACURH) was split from the Midwest Association of NACURH, bringing the number of regions to six. By this time, 130 schools were officially affiliated with NACURH, tripling the number of members from 1967. NACURH's mailing list also officially included member schools or contacts in all fifty states, plus several Canadian schools. The National Information Center (NIC) was also created in 1968.

In 1971, NACURH incorporated as a 501(c)(3) non-profit under Oklahoma law, granting the organization and its associate regions non-profit incorporation. This change in tax status meant that the regional associations became regional affiliates.

In 1980, the Midwest Affiliate was again split between the new Southwest Affiliate (SWACURH) and the Midwest Affiliate. This brought the total number of affiliate regions to seven. Institutional membership had also increased to 135.

In 1991 the North Atlantic Affiliate was split wholly to form two new regions for NACURH, the Central Atlantic (CAACURH) and the North Eastern (NEACURH) regions. This brought the total number of affiliate regions to eight, the current number. Additionally, the 1991 conference held at Arizona State University was record-breaking in terms of the number of delegates present, at 2,188.

In 1997, NACURH and its Affiliates gained tax-exempt status.

In 2016, NACURH Executives passed an amendment to the NACURH Policy Books. This amendment would un-affiliate NACURH from the various state associations/organizations/groups that existed around the country. In doing so, it was decided that NACURH and its affiliates would not fund, participate, coordinate, recognize, set aside time for state business, or conduct business with state level associations, groups and organizations or similar. As well, NACURH would prohibit state level associations and organizations from receiving benefits and services from corporate partners and sponsors. Furthermore, NRHH would no longer provide their benefits and services to state level associations and organizations.

At the 2019 annual business meeting, many regions voted to strike international affiliates from their regional charters. This decision was made due to the fact that though many regions claim to represent various international affiliates, many regions have not had any international colleges/universities affiliated in the past 3 years+. Regions with currently active/affiliated international colleges/universities would be allowed to keep these affiliates in their charters. Any international colleges/universities that may wish to affiliate with NACURH whose state/province/country is not explicitly stated in any region's charter, may apply for affiliate membership and then discuss with NACURH Executives to find which region would be the best fit for them.

In 2020, due to the COVID-19 pandemic, NACURH hosted its first-ever entirely virtual annual conference. The conference was planned to be hosted at University of Dayton which was then moved to be entirely virtual for fears of the spreading virus impacting those attending the conference from all around the country.

Strategic planning 

In 2014 through 2015, NACURH formed a strategic planning commission led by members of the Boards of Directors per a resolution passed in May 2014. The purpose of the NACURH Strategic Plan is to provide a clear direction for the future of the organization and company. With a clear direction, NACURH commits itself to providing residence hall leaders with skills and resources that they need in order to excel and positively impact their campus communities. This group performed the NACURH Services and Performance Assessment (NSPA) on the corporation as a whole, and, as a result, created a strategic plan for years 2015–2018. The new plan outlines necessary steps to improve NACURH and the way it serves member schools.

NACURH offices

NACURH Information Centre (NIC) (1967–2017)
Created in 1968, The NIC was the business office of NACURH, Inc. The NIC's projects and responsibilities included:  Maintaining the Resource File Index, updating and maintaining the national website, and keeping records of the dues of member schools. The NIC was merged with the NSRO to form the NCO following the close of the 2017 Annual Conference.

NACURH Services and Recognition Office (NSRO) (2007–2017)
The NSRO was created in 2007 when it succeeded the NRHH office. The NSRO Office was the services office of NACURH, Inc. and served as a support office for NACURH. The NSRO was created to provide non-technical services to NACURH and its member schools.  The NSRO was charged with creating and selling merchandise (pins, apparel, etc.) and creating and maintaining special national projects and developing other services for NACURH, Inc. as needed. The NSRO was merged with the NIC to form the NCO following the close of the 2017 Annual Conference.

NACURH Corporate Office (NCO)
During the NACURH 2016 Annual Conference, Boardroom Representatives voted to combine the NIC and the NSRO into the NACURH Corporate Office (NCO). The NACURH Corporate Office (NCO) serves as the Corporate Headquarters for NACURH, and is the central contact point for all correspondence. The NCO takes on the combined responsibilities of the former NSRO and NIC. Like other branches of NACURH, the NCO is entirely student-run by volunteer staff members from the host institution. The NCO is hosted at The University of Delaware and the Current NCO Director is Abigail Larson.

During the 2019-2020 affiliation year, it was determined that ACUHO-I, the professional international organization for College and University Housing Staff would become the permanent hosts of the NACURH Corporate Office and would manage the customer service aspects of hosting the office.

Regions

CAACURH 
The Central Atlantic Affiliate of College and University Residence Halls is made up of Delaware, Maryland, New Jersey, Ohio, Pennsylvania, Washington, D.C., and West Virginia. Prior to 1990 this region was part of NAACURH.

GLACURH 
The Great Lakes Affiliate of College and University Residence Halls is made up of Illinois, Indiana, Michigan, Wisconsin, and Ontario, Canada. It was broken off from MACURH in 1968.

IACURH 
The Intermountain Affiliate of College and University Residence Halls is made up of Arizona, Colorado, Idaho, Montana, New Mexico, Nevada, Utah, Wyoming, Alberta, Canada, and Saskatchewan, Canada. IACURH was formed from the Inter-Mountain Residence Hall Association, which merged with the original Midwest Dormitory Conference to form NACURH (then ACURH).

MACURH 
The Midwest Affiliate of College and University Residence Halls is composed of Iowa, Kansas, Minnesota, Missouri, Nebraska, North Dakota, and South Dakota. MACURH was formed from the original Midwest Dormitory Conference, which led to the formation of NACURH.

NEACURH 
The North East Affiliate of College and University Residence Halls is made up of Connecticut, Maine, Massachusetts, New Hampshire, New York, Rhode Island, and Vermont. Prior to 1990, this area was part of NAACURH.

PACURH 
The Pacific Affiliate of College and University Residence Halls is made up of Alaska, California, Hawaii, Oregon, Washington, and British Columbia. PACURH was initially formed in 1964. For 4 years (starting in 1975) PACURH split into two regions, the Pacific Northwest Affiliate (PNACURH) and the Southern Pacific Affiliate (SPACURH). In 1979, PNACURH and SPACURH merged back into one region, PACURH

SAACURH 
The  South Atlantic Affiliate of College and University Residence Halls is composed of Alabama, Florida, Georgia, Kentucky, Mississippi, North and South Carolina, Tennessee, Virginia and the Bahamas. It was formed in 1964.

SWACURH 
The Southwest Affiliate of College and University Residence Halls is made up of schools in Arkansas, Louisiana, Oklahoma, Texas, and Mexico. It was broken off from MACURH as its own region in 1980.

Annual Conference 
Each year a school is selected to host the following year's annual conference (also referred to as NACURH Conference).

Past conference hosts 

1954 - Iowa State University
1955 - University of Missouri
1956 - University of Colorado Boulder
1957 - University of Nebraska–Lincoln
1958 - Iowa State University
1959 - University of Missouri
1960 - Southern Illinois University Carbondale
1961 - Oklahoma State University
1962 - Montana State University
1963 - University of Arizona
1964 - University of Denver
1965 - Washington State University
1966 - Southern Illinois University Carbondale
1967 - University of Kansas
1968 - Pennsylvania State University
1969 - California State University, Long Beach
1970 - Texas Tech University
1971 - Oklahoma State University
1972 - University of Wisconsin–Stevens Point
1973 - University of Delaware
1974 - Illinois State University
1975 - University of Wisconsin–Stevens Point
1976 - Mississippi State University
1977 - Oklahoma State University
1978 - Ball State University
1979 - Kansas State University
1980 - University of North Carolina - Chapel Hill
1981 - Texas A&M University
1982 - University of Wisconsin–Whitewater
1983 - Pennsylvania State University
1984 - University of Colorado Boulder
1985 - University of Florida
1986 - University of San Francisco
1987 - Central Michigan University
1988 - University of Wisconsin–La Crosse
1989 - University of Northern Colorado with Colorado State University
1990 - Southwest Missouri State University
1991 - Arizona State University
1992 - University of North Dakota
1993 - University of South Carolina
1994 - Northern Arizona University with New Mexico State University
1995 - Virginia Polytechnic Institute and State University (Virginia Tech)
1996 - University of Oklahoma
1997 - Ball State University
1998 - University of Nebraska–Lincoln
1999 - University of Wisconsin–La Crosse
2000 - University of Colorado Boulder
2001 - University of Southern California
2002 - University of Minnesota
2003 - North Carolina State University
2004 - Saint Louis University
2005 - Syracuse University
2006 - University of California, Berkeley
2007 - University of Wisconsin–Oshkosh
2008 - Oklahoma State University
2009 - University of Arizona
2010 - University of California, San Diego
2011 - Western Illinois University
2012 - University of Colorado Boulder
2013 - University of Pittsburgh
2014 - University of Wisconsin–Eau Claire
2015 - North Dakota State University
2016 - University of Delaware
2017 - Purdue University
2018 - Arizona State University-Tempe
2019 - Louisiana State University
2020 - University of Dayton*
2021 - Hosted by Committee
2022 - Southern Oregon University

Awards 
At each annual conference, the following awards are given out:
NACURH Distinguished Service Award
NACURH First Year Experience Award
NACURH Hallenbeck Lifetime Service Award
Outstanding NRHH Member of the Year Award
NACURH NCC of the Year Award
NACURH RHA President of the Year Award
NRHH President of the Year Award
NACURH Student of the Year Award
NACURH Valerie Averill Advisor of the Year Award
NACURH Outstanding Advocacy Initiative of the Year
NACURH RHA Building Block of the Year
NACURH School of the Year Award
NRHH Building Block Chapter of the Year
NRHH Outstanding Chapter of the Year

Mascots 
Some regions have mascots, which make frequent appearances on T-shirts at national conferences and elsewhere.

NEACURH: Marty the Moose
IACURH: No mascot. The original mascot of a Monkey was removed early in 2020 and was switched to a Monarch Butterfly, which was removed later in 2020. The region has no plans to adopt a new mascot, instead sticking to its classic Rocky Mountain imagery.
PACURH: Jeremiah T. Frog
SWACURH: MALTO the Duck 
CAACURH: Campbell the Cougar
SAACURH: Louie the Lion
MACURH: Molly the Moo-Cow
GLACURH: MOWII the Polar Bear and HOMES the Oar
NACURH Executives: Turtle
NCO: Peacock

The Advancement Society 
In January, 1982, the NACURH National Board of Directors (NBD) approved a resolution authorizing a NACURH alumni association. This brochure was designed to introduce the "Association of Alumni and Friends of NACURH" to the general membership.

At the Semi-Annual Business Meeting 2016 the NACURH Board of Directors transitioned the Association of Alumni and Friends of NACURH (AAFN) to the Advancement Society. Creating new tiers and recognizing individuals who support NACURH. They also established a purpose: The purpose of the Advancement Society is to establish and recognize those who make individual monetary contributions to NACURH, Inc., providing an avenue to recognize others for their leadership in NACURH by donating on their behalf and generating interest money to support NACURH leadership development, recognition, scholarships, grants, honorariums and general financial support. And further listed the primary benefit of the Advancement Society is to provide contributors with recognition of their support. NACURH will solicit the individual's name, institution, permanent email address, years of involvement and short summary of involvement.

Leadership

The NACURH Executive Committee serves as the executive team of NACURH. The following are the executives for the 2022–23 affiliation year:

See also
National Residence Hall Honorary
National Communications Coordinator

References
Got NCCs? - contains history on NACURH
Winston, Robert and Anchors, Scott. Student Housing and Residential Life: A Handbook for Professionals Committed to Student Development Goals. Jossey-Bass, 1993. 
Dunkel, Norbert and Coleman, Jon. "NACURH Inc.: Sixty Years of Residence Hall Leadership" Thornson-Shore, 2014

Footnotes

External links
Official NACURH Website
Official NRHH Website
Official CAACURH Website
Official GLACURH Website
Official IACURH Website
Official MACURH Website
Official NEACURH Website
Official PACURH Website
Official SAACURH Website
Official SWACURH Website

University organizations
International college and university associations and consortia
Student organizations in the United States